Switchback School, also known as Union Hurst School, is a historic Rosenwald school located near Hot Springs, Bath County, Virginia.  It was built in 1924–1925, and is a one-story, frame, graded two-teacher type of public school. It is sheathed in weatherboard and has a side-gable roof.  A major addition at the south end was built in 1933 and a second addition was built about 1960.  Also on the property are a contributing privy (c. 1950); a cistern constructed as part of a Civilian Conservation Corps site improvement project (late-1930s); and three stone walls built by the workers from the Works Progress Administration (late-1930s).  It is one of approximately 70 Rosenwald schools that survive of the 364 that were built across Virginia for the education of African-American students.

It was added to the National Register of Historic Places in 2013.

References

African-American history of Virginia
Rosenwald schools in Virginia
School buildings on the National Register of Historic Places in Virginia
School buildings completed in 1925
Schools in Bath County, Virginia
National Register of Historic Places in Bath County, Virginia
1925 establishments in Virginia